Ronald Benade (born 31 March 1987, in Kwekwe) is a Zimbabwean cricketer who played in the 2006 Under-19 Cricket World Cup in Sri Lanka.

See also
Cricket in Zimbabwe

References

External links

1987 births
Living people
Sportspeople from Kwekwe
Zimbabwean cricketers
Midlands cricketers
21st-century Zimbabwean people